The  Military Ordinariate in El Salvador  is a Latin Church ecclesiastical territory or military ordinariate of the Catholic Church with jurisdiction over Catholics serving in the Armed Forces of El Salvador. While not a diocese, the ordinary of the ordinariate is a bishop. The ordinariate is exempt directly to the Holy See and the Roman Congregation for Bishops.

It is headquartered Calle Los Eucaliptos y Avda. Las Gardenias 157, Colonia Las Mercedes in San Salvador, the national capital of El Salvador, in Central America.

History 
It was established as a Military vicariate of El Salvador on 25 March 1968, with the first military vicar appointed on 4 November 1968.
 
It was elevated to a military ordinariate on 21 July 1986.

According to an online news brief from Catholic News Service (CNS) posted on Tuesday, September 11, 2012, Bishop Abarca and former guerrilla commander Raul Mijango have mediated an often-doubted but so far successful cease-fire between El Salvador's two most prominently violent gangs: MS-13 (Mara Salvatrucha), and Barrio 18, which had roots in civil war-era young Salvadorans who illegally entered the U.S. and experienced the gangs there before deportation.

Statistics 
As per 2014, it provides pastoral care to Roman Catholics serving in the Armed Forces of El Salvador and their families in 37 parishes with 38 priests (diocesan) and 6 seminarians.

Ordinaries 
Military Vicar of El Salvador
 José Eduardo Alvarez Ramírez, C.M. (appointed 4 November 1968 – see below became military ordinary 21 July 1986), Titular Bishop of Tabunia (1965.10.07 – 1969.12.09), also Auxiliary Bishop of San Salvador (El Salvador) (1965.10.07 – 1968.11.04)

 Military Ordinaries of El Salvador
 José Eduardo Alvarez Ramírez, Congregation of the Mission (C.M.) (see above 21 July 1986 – resigned 7 March 1987), also Bishop of San Miguel (El Salvador) (1969.12.09 – retired 1997.04.10) and President of Episcopal Conference of El Salvador (1980 – 1983), died 2000
 Roberto Joaquín Ramos Umaña (appointed 7 March 1987 – died 23 June 1993), Titular Bishop of Sebarga (1987.03.07 – 1993.06.23)
 Apostolic Administrator Fernando Sáenz Lacalle (1993.07.03 – 1997.06.19), while first Auxiliary Bishop of Santa Ana (El Salvador) (1984.12.22 – 1995.04.22) and Titular Bishop of Tabbora (1984.12.22 – 1995.04.22), later Metropolitan Archbishop of San Salvador (1995.04.22 – retired 2008.12.27) and President of Episcopal Conference of El Salvador (1998 – 2008.12.27)
 Apostolic Administrator Father Luis Morao Andreazza, Friars Minor (O.F.M.) (1997.06.19 – 2003.11.12), later Auxiliary Bishop of Santa Ana (El Salvador) (2003.11.12 – 2007.04.21) and Titular Bishop of Tullia (2003.11.12 – 2007.04.21), then Bishop of Chalatenango (El Salvador) (2007.04.21 – retired 2016.07.14)
 Apostolic Administrator Fabio Reynaldo Colindres Abarca (2003.11.12 – 2008.02.02 see below)
 Fabio Reynaldo Colindres Abarca (see above, appointed 2 February 2008 –  ...); also Apostolic Administrator of Sonsonate (El Salvador) (2011.10.08 – 2012.06.11); appointed Bishop of San Miguel 2017.12.07

See also 

 List of Catholic dioceses in El Salvador

References 

 Obispado Castrense en El Salvador (GCatholic.org - data for all sections)
 Military Ordinariate of El Salvador (Catholic-Hierarchy)

Roman Catholic dioceses in El Salvador
Military ordinariates